Shin Eun-kyung (born 15 February 1973) is a South Korean actress. She is best known for her leading roles in Downfall (1997) and My Wife Is a Gangster (2001). Shin is most prominent Korean actress in the 1990s, alongside Shim Eun-ha, Go So-young and Jeon Do-yeon, whom she starred with on General Hospital.

Career
Shin began appearing in commercials in 1986 at the age of 13, and made her television debut in 1988 on KBS. Throughout the late eighties and early nineties, she acted in a great number of films and TV dramas (notably in the 2001 medical drama General Hospital), garnering fame for her warm screen presence. In 1997, however, she took on her most daring role as a prostitute in veteran director Im Kwon-taek's Downfall. The film was a box-office success, leading her to star status.

In 1999, she starred in two films, including the Korean-Japanese co-produced horror film The Ring Virus, based on the novel by Koji Suzuki. Her success in this role led to her being cast in a small role for a Japanese film, Uzumaki (also known as Spiral). Around this time, Shin was also working as an MC for a television game show.

In 2002, Shin starred in her most famous role as a tough, female gang boss in My Wife Is a Gangster. The film drew more than 5 million spectators and became a strong hit throughout Asia. She also appeared in the sequel, My Wife Is a Gangster 2, but the film faltered at the box office in 2003. Other roles Shin starred in around this time were as a detective in This Is Law (also known as Out of Justice), as a professional matchmaker in the romantic comedy A Perfect Match, and as a naval officer in the box office bomb Blue.

Shin went on a short hiatus after she married and had a baby, and returned to acting in 2005, starring in films such as Bystanders and Mr. Housewife, and television series such as Bad Couple, Mom's Dead Upset, White Lie, Still You, and The Scandal. She gained praise for her impassioned portrayals of ruthless and ambitious women in the 2010 melodrama Flames of Desire and the 2014 revenge thriller The Plan.

Other activities
Shin has been a professor at Seoul Hoseo Art College's Department of Performing Arts since 2011.

Personal life
On 22 September 2003, Shin married Kim Jung-soo, who was then the CEO of her talent agency Good Player Entertainment. The following year, she gave birth to a son, who was later diagnosed with hydrocephalus. On 24 August 2007, Shin filed for divorce when she learned that Kim had used her private seal without her permission to misappropriate  for his business after its merger with Fantom Entertainment and the box office failure of several films he'd produced. In November, Shin sued Kim for forgery of private documents. On 28 December 2008, the court ruled that Shin was not liable for her ex-husband's debts, stating that although Shin's seal is on the loan contract, Shin had not seen any of the money loaned, had not authorized her seal's use, and is therefore not responsible for the debt.

She again landed in the entertainment headlines in 2011 when she underwent bimaxillary osteotomy surgery (or jaw realignment surgery), reportedly because she felt making her strong jawline "slimmer and more rounded" would give her a "younger, softer, more feminine" look, which would result in more acting roles. Shin later spoke candidly that she regretted having undergone the procedure for pure cosmetic purposes, saying the public should be better informed about the pain and danger associated with the invasive surgery. In 2012, she sued an oriental medicine clinic for violating her portrait rights and privacy after it posted false ads on the internet without her permission, featuring her photo and treatment process; she had gone to the clinic to decrease the swelling of her face, a side effect of her jaw reconstruction surgery, but the clinic's treatments proved ineffective.

Filmography

Film

Television series

Variety show

Music video

Awards and nominations

References

External links
Shin Eun-kyung at Run Entertainment 

South Korean film actresses
South Korean television actresses
Dankook University alumni
People from Busan
1973 births
Living people